Wolak is a surname. Notable people with the surname include:

Ewa Wolak (born 1960), Polish politician
Marsha Wolak (born 1958), American poker player and tennis player
Paweł Wolak (born 1981), Polish boxer
Robert Wolak (born 1955), Polish mathematician

See also 
Wolak Peak, peak in the Inland Forts northwest of St. Pauls Mountain in the Asgard Range, Victoria Land